HMS Pelican was a 24-gun  sixth-rate post ship of the Royal Navy built in 1777 and wrecked in 1781.

Construction and commissioning
Pelican cost £5,623.11.0d to build, plus £3,545.0.7d for fitting . She was commissioned under her first commanding officer, Captain Henry Lloyd, in May 1777.

Service
Pelican was first stationed under Lloyd in the North Sea; by 1778 she was stationed off Cape Finisterre and a year later she had transferred to the coast of Portugal. She returned to England for a refit at Sheerness Dockyard between August and September 1779 and was recommissioned in November with Captain William Lockhart in command. Lockhart only stayed with Pelican briefly and by January 1780 Captain Thomas Haynes had assumed command of the post ship. Under him she sailed for the Jamaica Station on 13 April, where she captured the French privateer La Marquise de Saint-Pern on 9 December. In June 1781 Captain Cuthbert Collingwood took command from Haynes. Pelican captured the French 16-gun ship Le Cerf on 22 July.

Fate
On 2 August Pelican was caught up in a hurricane and wrecked on the Morant Keys.

Citations

References
 

 

1777 ships
Porcupine-class post ships
Ships built in Deptford
Maritime incidents in 1781